Lakhdar Belloumi (born on 29 December 1958) is an Algerian former football player and manager. He is widely considered as the best Algerian player of all time and one of the best players in Africa. He is said to have invented the "Blind Pass". He is awarded the 4th best African player of the century. He holds the record as the most capped Algerian player with 100 national caps (147 caps not recognized by FIFA) and is also the third best goalscorer of the Algerian national team in all time with 28 goals (34 goals not recognized by FIFA).

Belloumi's goal against reigning European champions West Germany earned Algeria a stunning 2–1 victory in their World Cup debut in Spain '82.

Club career

Belloumi spent almost his entire career at home (apart from a brief spell in Qatar late in his career), most notably with his hometown club GC Mascara, as well as MC Oran. He played also with MC Alger for two years during his military service in Algiers. He won two domestic championships during his career in 1984 with GC Mascara and in 1988 with MC Oran. After returning for another spell in Mascara in 1994, he continued playing until retirement in 1999.

Belloumi had contact with various European clubs, including Barcelona, before Spain '82, but "the law did not allow us to leave the country before the age of 27". In 1985, he caught the eye of Juventus after shining in a friendly against them, only to miss out on a dream transfer after breaking his leg in the African Champions' Cup in Libya against Al-Ittihad. He was understandably disappointed "It was a real shame for me that I couldn't go".

Often overlooked for international recognition due to not joining a major European club, despite the interest of major European clubs (Juventus were reportedly very keen to acquire his services despite the performances of Michel Platini). Belloumi was recognised by any who watched him play, including the great Pelé, as a fantastic player.

International career
Belloumi has a total of 147 caps and 34 goals for Algeria national team but only 100 caps and 28 goals are recognized by FIFA.
He participated at 1980 Summer Olympics, at two editions of FIFA World Cup (1982 and 1986), at four editions of Africa Cup of Nations (1980, 1982, 1984 and 1988) and at two editions of Mediterranean Games (1979 and 1983).
In 1981, he was awarded African Footballer of the Year. Belloumi scored the winning goal in the 2–1 win over West Germany in the 1982 World Cup, and was a pivotal player in the Algerian national team throughout the 1980s. His last game for Algeria came in 1989.

Career statistics

Clubs

Club statistics

African competition
Scores and results list Algeria's goal tally first. "Score" column indicates the score after the player's goal.

International statistics

National team statistics

International goals
Scores and results list Algeria's goal tally first. "Score" column indicates the score after the player's goal.

International goals (vs clubs)

Honours

Clubs
GC Mascara
Algerian Championship: 1983–84

MC Oran
Algerian Championship: 1987–88; Runner-up 1989–90
African Cup of Champions Clubs: Runner-up 1989
Arab Club Champions Cup: Runner-up 2001 (as a manager)

International
Mediterranean Games: Bronze medal 1979
Africa Cup of Nations: Runner-up 1980; Third 1984, 1988
Summer Olympics: Quarter final 1980
FIFA World Cup: Participation 1982, 1986

Individual
Awards
 Mediterranean Games 3rd best player: 1979
 Africa Cup of Nations best forward: 1980
 African Footballer of the Year: 1981; Third 1982
 Africa Cup of Nations Team of the Tournament: 1980, 1984
 African Footballer of the 20th century: Fourth place
 IFFHS World Player of the Century #62: 2000
 CAF Merit Award: 2008 (to his career excellence)
 Algerian Footballer of the 20th century: 2009 (with Rabah Madjer)
 Algerian Footballer of the Year: Several awards

Performances
 Algerian League goalscorer: 1978–79 with 11 goals
 Africa Cup of Nations goalscorer: 1988 (with R. Milla, A. Traoré & G. Abdelhamid) with 2 goals

Controversy
Belloumi was a subject of an arrest warrant in Egypt for almost 20 years following an incident in Cairo in 1989 when after a 1990 FIFA World Cup qualifying match a brawl erupted to the hostel residence of the Algeria team, between players of the Algerian squad and Egyptian supporters that left an Egyptian fan, doctor by profession, seriously injured in his eye by a broken bottle which was attributed to be thrown by Belloumi. From 2006, he was added among the lists of the accused in Interpol.

The Algerian authorities accused Egypt of wanting deliberately to accuse Belloumi who was the biggest star of the country, to make diversion against hostile events that Algeria team has suffered during the qualifying match in Cairo. Belloumi always claimed his innocence and teammates present at the incident had also testified before the Algerian justice that it was goalkeeper Kamel Kadri responsible for inflicting the injury.

The warrant was finally rescinded in April 2009 and Belloumi was cleared of all legal proceedings at the initiative of Algerian president Abdelaziz Bouteflika in collaboration of the Algerian and Egyptian authorities.

Further reading 
 Grine, Hamid. (1986) Lakhdar Belloumi, un footballeur algérien, Algiers, Entreprise Nationale du Livre (Enal).

See also

 List of men's footballers with 100 or more international caps

References

External links

Profile at kazeo.com (MC Alger fansite)
 
Lakhdar Belloumi: The Wizard of Maghreb at A Halftime Report

1958 births
Living people
People from Mascara, Algeria
Algerian footballers
Algerian expatriate footballers
Algeria international footballers
Olympic footballers of Algeria
Qatar Stars League players
Association football midfielders
FIFA Century Club
Footballers at the 1980 Summer Olympics
1982 FIFA World Cup players
1986 FIFA World Cup players
1980 African Cup of Nations players
1982 African Cup of Nations players
1984 African Cup of Nations players
1988 African Cup of Nations players
Mediterranean Games bronze medalists for Algeria
Competitors at the 1979 Mediterranean Games
Competitors at the 1983 Mediterranean Games
GC Mascara players
MC Oran players
MC Alger players
USM Bel Abbès players
ASM Oran players
Al-Arabi SC (Qatar) players
Algerian football managers
Algeria national football team managers
MC Oran managers
Umm Salal SC managers
Expatriate footballers in Qatar
Expatriate football managers in Qatar
Algerian expatriate sportspeople in Qatar
Algeria youth international footballers
African Footballer of the Year winners
Mediterranean Games medalists in football
21st-century Algerian people